"Days Go By" is a pop punk song by the American punk rock band the Offspring. It is featured as the third track on the band's ninth studio album of the same name and was released as its first single. The song was premiered on the Los Angeles, California rock station KROQ on April 27, 2012. "Days Go By" was released to radio on May 1, 2012; the song was written by frontman/lyricist Dexter Holland. It peaked at No. 2 on the US  Mainstream Rock chart.

Background
"Days Go By" was one of the first songs the Offspring started working on for the Days Go By album, and was almost the last to be completed. "We really kept coming back to it over the course of the record", said frontman/lyricist Dexter Holland. It was originally not going to be on the album, depending on how it was doing next to the other songs as the album was being written. "There are versions on YouTube where the guitar riff is different, the verse is different, the chorus is different-so it's a totally different song now, really. It was kind of toward the end [of recording] when people started listening to it. My friends, my manager started pointing at it, saying, 'That's the one you've got to go with."

Lyrics
Speaking of the lyrics, Holland commented, "It's me observing that people have been going through a shitty time in the last few years, including myself. I just wanted to put some hope out there and say that no matter how bad it is, nobody's going to pick you up. You've got to do it yourself and there is hope and you're going to do it."

Reception
"Days Go By" received positive response. Amy Sciarretto of Loudwire described it as "gimmick-free" and "a bit more contemplative, lyrically and comparatively speaking, as Holland ponders the then and the now. Overall, it has the bouncy rock vibe of a Foo Fighters tune with the added sprinkle of the Offspring's American punk rock flavor." The song received another positive review from Sylvie Lesas of Evigshed, who called it a "cool song, awesome sonic trip through the sounds of 90s and modern rock that rips and doesn't disappoint." Lesas also described it as a "memorable melody, intense distorted guitars and infectious chorus/verses making this song, thrilling enough to whet your appetite for their upcoming album."

Charts

Weekly charts

Year-end charts

Personnel
Dexter Holland – lead vocals, rhythm guitar, piano
Noodles – lead guitar, backing vocals
Greg K. – bass guitar, backing vocals
Pete Parada – drums, percussion (live and video clip)
Josh Freese – drums, percussion (studio)
Jamie Edwards - keyboards

References

External links

The Offspring songs
Columbia Records singles
2012 songs
2012 singles
Song recordings produced by Bob Rock
Songs written by Dexter Holland